The 1932 German federal election may refer to:

 July 1932 German federal election
 November 1932 German federal election